The Saltasassi is an Italian breed of upland sheep, reared for meat. It originates in the provinces of Verbano Cusio Ossola and Novara in the northern part of Piemonte, in north-west Italy.  It is one of the forty-two autochthonous local sheep breeds of limited distribution for which a herdbook is kept by the Associazione Nazionale della Pastorizia, the Italian national association of sheep-breeders.

The population in 1983 was estimated at 2500. In 2013 the total number for the breed was not recorded; in 2012 it was 37. A study conducted by the region of Piemonte in 2000 found the Saltasassi to be virtually extinct.

References

Sheep breeds originating in Italy